Malaysia competed in the 2002 Commonwealth Games held in Manchester, England from 25 July to 4 August 2002.

Medal summary

Medals by sport

Multiple medalists
Malaysian competitors that have won at least two medals.

Medallists

Athletics

Men
Track event

Field event

Women
Track and road events

Key
Note–Ranks given for track events are within the athlete's heat only
Q = Qualified for the next round
q = Qualified for the next round as a fastest loser or, in field events, by position without achieving the qualifying target
NR = National record
N/A = Round not applicable for the event
Bye = Athlete not required to compete in round

Badminton

Individual

Doubles

Team

Boxing

Men

Cycling

Road

Track
Sprint

Pursuit

Points race

|}

Diving

Men

Women

Gymnastics

Artistic

Men

Hockey

Women's tournament

Pool 1

Seventh and eighth place match

Ranked 8th in final standings

Lawn bowls

Men

Women

Rugby sevens

Men's tournament
Malaysia has qualified a rugby sevens team.

Pool D

Bowl
Quarterfinal

Shooting

Men
Pistol/Small bore

Shotgun

Full bore

Women
Pistol/Small bore

Squash

Individual

Doubles

Swimming

Men

Women

Synchronized swimming

Table tennis

Singles

Doubles

Team

Triathlon

Men

Weightlifting

Men

Powerlifting

References

Malaysia at the Commonwealth Games
Nations at the 2002 Commonwealth Games
2002 in Malaysian sport